Unhel is a city in Ujjain district in the Indian state of Madhya Pradesh. It is in the Malwa region of western Madhya Pradesh.

Geography 
It has an average elevation of 495 metres (1624 feet).

Demographics 
Unhel Population Census 2011—Unhel is a Nagar Panchayat city in district of Ujjain. The Unhel city is divided into 15 wards for which elections are held every 5 years. The Unhel Nagar Panchayat has population of 14,774 of which 7,506 are males while 7,268 are females as per report released by Census India 2011.

Population of children with age of 0-6 is 1886 which is 12.77% of total population of Unhel (NP). In Unhel Nagar Panchayat, female sex ratio is of 968 against state average of 931. Moreover, child sex ratio in Unhel is around 907 compared to the state average of 918. Literacy rate of Unhel is 72.65% higher than state average of 69.32%. In Unhel, male literacy is around 83.08% while female literacy rate is 61.98%.

Unhel Nagar Panchayat has total administration over 2,582 houses to which it supplies basic amenities like water and sewerage. It is also authorized to build roads within Nagar Panchayat limits and impose taxes on properties coming under its jurisdiction.

Transportation

Road 
Unhel is near A MPSH17
 Ujjain  - 30 KM
 Nagda   - 20 Km
 Indore  - 94 KM
 Bhopal  - 232 KM
 Neemuch - 170 Km
 Jaipur  - 542 KM
 Udaipur - 300 KM
 Delhi   - 810 KM
 Mumbai  - 680 Km

Railway 
Unhel railway station is 10 km from the city  
 Nagad Jn (NAD) 20 km.
 Ujjain Jn (UJN) 30KM. 
 Nagda is a Center Station of a New Delhi - Mumbai Central Rail Route .

Air
Nagda has one air strip about 20 km from the city. The nearest airport is located in Indore about 100 km from the city.

Work Profile 
Out of total population, 5,506 were engaged in work or business activity. Of this 4,155 were males while 1,351 were females. In census survey, worker is defined as person who is in business or having a job such as in farming, cultivating and labour activity. Of total 5506 working population, 89.14% were engaged in Main Work while 10.86% of total workers were engaged in Marginal Work.

References 

Cities and towns in Ujjain district